Acacia woodmaniorum, also known as Woodman's wattle, is a shrub belonging to the genus Acacia and subgenus Alatae. It is native to a small area in Western Australia.

Description
The green glabrous branches are flexuose. The phyllodes form opposite wings along the length of the branchlets. The shrub blooms in June producing simple inflorescences that have one or two globular heads each containing 27 to 28 light golden flowers.

Taxonomy
The species was first formally described by the botanists Bruce Maslin and Carrie Buscumb in 2007 in the work Two new species of Acacia (Leguminosae: Mimosoideae) from banded ironstone ranges in the Midwest region of south-west Western Australia as published in the journal Nuytsia.

The type specimen was collected by Maslin in June 2006. The species is named to honour the brothers Simon, Richard and Greg Woodman, who have been great assistance to Maslin.

Distribution
The species is found in a small area near Perenjori in the Mid West region of Western Australia. It grows red silt and thin sands over red ironstone and laterite on crests and ridges of ranges. Only three populations in the Blue Hill Range are known. The species is mostly found in tall shrubland communities or thickets dominated by other Acacia species, Allocasuarina acutivalvis or Eucalyptus petraea

See also
List of Acacia species

References

woodmaniorum
Acacias of Western Australia
Plants described in 2007
Taxa named by Bruce Maslin